Justificatio sola fide (or simply sola fide), meaning justification by faith alone, is a soteriological doctrine in Christian theology commonly held to distinguish the Lutheran and Reformed traditions of Protestantism, among others, from the Catholic, Eastern Orthodox, Oriental Orthodox and Assyrian churches. The doctrine asserts that it is on the basis of faith that believers are made right of their transgressions of the law of God rather than on the basis of what Paul calls "works of the law", sometimes called good works. This forgiveness is known as "justification". In classical Lutheran and Reformed theologies, works are seen to be evidence of faith, but the works themselves do not determine salvation. In contrast, Methodist doctrine affirms a belief in justification by faith that offers God's forgiveness, but holds that holy living with the goal of Christian perfection (sanctification) is essential for salvation.

The doctrine of justification by faith alone and the role of repentance has been interpreted differently by different Protestants, causing multiple controversies such as: the Antinomian controversy, the Marrow controversy and the Lordship salvation controversy.

History

Pre-Reformation 

The doctrine of faith alone precedes Martin Luther in the theologies of many proto-Protestant reformers: Wessel Gansfort, Jacques Lefèvre d'Étaples, Gottschalk, Claudius of Turin and possibly also in Johann Pupper. The doctrine of sola fide also seems to appear in the doctrine of John Wycliffe, as he stated: "Trust wholly in Christ; rely altogether on his sufferings; beware of seeking to be justified in any other way than by his righteousness. Faith in our Lord Jesus Christ is sufficient for salvation.". According to some historians Luther's view on the doctrine of sola fide was influenced by the Italian reformer Girolamo Savonarola. Savonarola himself declared that works are a result of predestination and not a cause of predestination, and his views were praised by Martin Luther himself, who read his works. It is untrue that God’s grace is obtained by pre-existing works of merit as though works and deserts were the cause of predestination. On the contrary, these are the result of predestination. Tell me, Peter; tell me, O Magdalene, wherefore are ye in paradise? Confess that not by your own merits have ye obtained salvation, but by the goodness of God.... Not by their own deservings, O Lord, or by their own works have they been saved, lest any man should be able to boast, but because it seemed good in Thy sight - Girolamo Savonarola

Medieval 
Some have argued that Ildefonsus and Julian of Toledo believed that faith alone was sufficient for salvation, Julian of Toledo made statements such as "all effort of human argument must be suspended where faith alone is sufficient".

Protestants also have claimed that the writings of Clairvaux include the doctrine of justification by faith alone.

Early Church 

According to Thomas Schreiner sola fide can be found in some apostolic fathers. He contends that Clement of Rome, Ignatius of Antioch and the Epistle to Diognetus viewed salvation as being God's work granted to those who exercise faith, which then causes works. Clement's view on justification has caused much scholarly discussion, because Clement asserted: "we are not justified through ourselves, but through faith", but still emphasizing God's judgement upon wickedness. Some see Clement as believing in faith alone but that faith will lead into doing good works, while some others have argued that Clement held synergist views. The Epistle to Diognetus talks much about the human inability to merit justification themselves by their own good works. However, for the apostolic fathers, the Shepherd of Hermas has a clear rejection of the faith alone doctrine, instead holding works to have merit. The Didache also appears to see works as meritorious, though not unambigiously.In whom was it possible for us, the lawless and ungodly, to be justified, except in the Son of God alone? O sweet exchange, O the incomprehensible work of God, O the unexpected blessings, that the sinfulness of many should be hidden in one righteous man, while the righteousness of one should justify many sinners - Epistle to Diognetus

Thomas Schreiner asserted that because justification wasn't a big issue in the patristic perioid, "thus the theology isn’t always integrated or consistent", however Schreiner argued that people such as John Chrysostom, and Ambrosiaster had similarities to the views of  justification as the reformers did:"By faith alone one is freely forgiven of all sins and the believer is no longer burdened by the Law for meriting good works. Our works, however, are demonstrative of our faith and will determine whether we are ultimately justified"  —Ambrosiaster 

Schreiner observes that Augustine of Hippo differs from the reformers as he understood the word "justify" to mean make righteous and not declare righteous, and thus he denied imputed righteousness, he also saw salvation as a process, despite that, he still had very grace oriented views of salvation, having similarities to the views reformers later would believe. Jovinian, who is often seen as a heretic by Catholics and as a forerunner by Protestants, has been argued to have been a very early witness to a Protestant view of justification. It has been argued that Marius Victorinus and Hilary of Poitiers taught faith alone. Marius Victorinus wrote that our own merits do not justify us and that we are justified by faith alone, however works should follow from that faith. Hilary of Poitiers seemed to have believed grace oriented views of salvation, which is by faith: as he declared "salvation is entirely by faith", Hilary often contrasts salvific faith and salvation by works, which leads to unbelief. He also believed salvation to be by grace in the Old Testament and he saw Abraham as a model for the Jews, who was justified by faith.

Thomas R. Schreiner argued that the Odes of Solomon taught that works do not justify a person, but instead faith, he also argued that the book supports imputed righteousness. Schreiner wrote that some statements made by Origen are consistent with the doctrine of faith alone, claiming that faith is the foundation of justification, but that he is not very clear on his view of justification.

Clement of Alexandria taught that faith was the basis of salvation, however he also believed that faith was also the basis of "gnosis" which for him mean spiritual and mystical knowledge.

According to Philip Schaff faith alone was not clearly taught by most church fathers, except for Clement of Rome.

Because Polycarp does not make enough statements on salvation, he could have been either believed sola fide or that both works and faith are needed, but it is unclear which one he believed from his few statements.

In contrast, the Catholic Encyclopedia indicates that Clement of Rome held works to be meritorious and holding works to be a part of justification.

Catholic Answers wrote that Origen, Cyprian, Aphraates, Gregory of Nyssa, Clement of Alexandria, Gregory the Great and Jerome held that both faith and works are part of the process of salvation.Whoever dies in his sins, even if he profess to believe in Christ, does not truly believe in him; and even if that which exists without works be called faith, such faith is dead in itself, as we read in the epistle bearing the name of James” - Origen

Paul, joining righteousness to faith and weaving them together, constructs of them the breastplates for the infantryman, armoring the soldier properly and safely on both sides. A soldier cannot be considered safely armored when either shield is disjoined from the other. Faith without works of justice is not sufficient for salvation; neither is righteous living secure in itself of salvation, if it is disjoined from faith - Gregory of Nyssa

Neither faith without works nor works without faith is of any avail, except, perhaps, that works may go towards the reception of faith, just as Cornelius, before he had become one of the faithful, merited to be heard on account of his good works. From this it can be gathered that his performance of good works furthered his reception of faith” - Gregory the Great

When we hear, ‘Your faith has saved you,’ we do not understand the Lord to say simply that they will be saved who have believed in whatever manner, even if works have not followed. To begin with, it was to the Jews alone that he spoke this phrase, who had lived in accord with the law and blamelessly and who had lacked only faith in the Lord - Clement of Alexandria

Centrality in the doctrine of the Protestant Reformation
The doctrine of sola fide asserts that God's pardon for guilty sinners is granted to and received through faith alone, excluding all "works" (good deeds). Without God's input, mankind, Christianity asserts, is fallen and sinful, meaning its actions and omissions are afflicted by the curse and most if not all would face God's wrath due to the fall of man (which spelt the end of Eden). God, the faith holds, sent his only Son in human form, to be reborn in all mankind so through Jesus Christ alone (solus Christus) sinners may receive pardon (justification), which is granted solely through faith.

Christ's righteousness, according to the followers of sola fide, is imputed (or attributed) by God to sinners coming to a state of true, loving belief (as opposed to infused or imparted). If so God's verdict and potential pardon is from genuinely held Christian faith (or in a few more liberal sects, all of Christ's principles) rather than anything in the sinner. This contrasts with other supposed means of grace, such as priestly confession and rituals such as weekly taking of the sacrament. See the ordo salutis for more detail on the doctrine of salvation considered more broadly than justification by faith alone.

The standalone sola fide justification of souls is a tenet of most Lutheran and Reformed churches but neither the Roman Catholic nor the Eastern Orthodox churches affirm it. These Protestant traditions exclude all human works (except the works of Jesus Christ, which form the basis of justification) from the legal verdict (or pardon) of justification. According to Martin Luther, justification by faith alone is the article on which the Church stands or falls. Thus, "faith alone" is foundational to Lutheranism and Reformed Christianity, and as a formula distinguishes it from other Christian denominations.

Lutheran theology

From 1510 to 1520, Martin Luther lectured on the Book of Psalms and the Pauline epistles to the Galatians, Hebrews, and Romans. As he studied these portions of the Bible, he came to view the use of terms such as penance and righteousness by the Roman Catholic Church in new ways (see Genesis , Galatians , Romans ). He became convinced that the Roman Catholic Church was corrupt in its ways and had lost sight of what he saw as several of the central truths of Christianity, the most important of which, for Luther, was the doctrine of justification—God's act of declaring a sinner righteous—by faith alone through God's grace. Therefore, he began to teach that salvation or redemption is a gift of God's grace, attainable exclusively through faith in Jesus Christ.

"This one and firm rock, which we call the doctrine of justification," insisted Luther, "is the chief article of the whole Christian doctrine, which comprehends the understanding of all godliness." He also called this doctrine the articulus stantis et cadentis ecclesiae ("article of the standing and falling church"): "if this article stands, the Church stands; if it falls, the Church falls." For Lutherans this doctrine is the material principle of theology in relation to the Bible, which is the formal principle. They believe justification by grace alone through faith alone in Christ's righteousness alone is the gospel, the core of the Christian faith around which all other Christian doctrines are centered and based.

Luther came to understand justification as entirely the work of God. When God's righteousness is mentioned in the gospel, it is God's action of declaring righteous the unrighteous sinner who has faith in Jesus Christ. The righteousness by which the person is justified (declared righteous) is not his own (theologically, proper righteousness) but that of another, Christ (alien righteousness). "That is why faith alone makes someone just and fulfills the law," said Luther. "Faith is that which brings the Holy Spirit through the merits of Christ." Thus faith, for Luther, is a gift from God, and "a living, bold trust in God's grace, so certain of God's favor that it would risk death a thousand times trusting in it." This faith grasps Christ's righteousness and appropriates it for the believer. He explained his concept of "justification" in the Smalcald Articles:

Traditionally, Lutherans have taught forensic (or legal) justification, a divine verdict of acquittal pronounced on the believing sinner. God declares the sinner to be "not guilty" because Christ has taken his place, living a perfect life according to God's law and suffering for his sins. For Lutherans, justification is in no way dependent upon the thoughts, words, and deeds of those justified through faith alone in Christ. The new obedience that the justified sinner renders to God through sanctification follows justification as a consequence, but is not part of justification.

Lutherans believe that individuals receive this gift of salvation through faith alone. Saving faith is the knowledge of, acceptance of, and trust in the promise of the Gospel. Even faith itself is seen as a gift of God, created in the hearts of Christians by the work of the Holy Spirit through the Word and Baptism. Faith is seen as an instrument that receives the gift of salvation, not something that causes salvation. Thus, Lutherans reject the "decision theology" which is common among modern evangelicals.

For Lutherans, justification provides the power by which Christians can grow in holiness. Such improvement comes about in the believer only after he has become a new creation in Christ through Holy Baptism. This improvement is not completed in this life: Christians are always "saint and sinner at the same time" (simul iustus et peccator)—saints because they are holy in God's eyes, for Christ's sake, and do works that please him; sinners because they continue to sin until death.

Origin of the term 

Martin Luther elevated sola fide to the principal cause of the Protestant Reformation, the rallying cry of the Lutheran cause, and the chief distinction of the Lutheran and Reformed branches of Christianity from Roman Catholicism. John Calvin, also a proponent of this doctrine, taught that "every one who would obtain the righteousness of Christ must renounce his own." According to Calvin, it is only because the sinner is able to obtain the good standing of the Son of God, through faith in him, and union with him, that sinners have any hope of pardon from, acceptance by, and peace with God.

Historically, the expression—"justification by faith alone"— has appeared in a number of Catholic bible translations: the Nuremberg Bible (1483) in Galatians  ("δικαιοῦται ἄνθρωπος ... διὰ πίστεως Χριστοῦ Ἰησοῦ") has "nur durch den glauben", and the Italian translations of 1476, 1538, and 1546 have "ma solo per la fede" or "per la sola fede". The official Italian Bible of the Catholic Church, La Sacra Bibbia della Conferenza Episcopale Italiana (2008), in Galatians 2:16, reads in part: "but only through faith in Jesus Christ" (ma soltanto per mezzo della fede).

The "faith alone" expression also appears in at least nine English Bible translations:

 Amplified Bible (AMP)
 Amplified Bible, Classic Edition (AMPC)
 God's Word Translation (GW)
 Good News Translation (GNT)
 Living Bible (TLB)
 The Message (MSG)
 Names of God Bible (NOG)
 The Voice (VOICE)
 Weymouth New Testament (WNY)

Luther added the word allein ("alone" in German) to Romans  controversially so that it read: "So now we hold, that man is justified without the help of the works of the law, alone through faith". The word "alone" does not appear in the Greek manuscripts and Luther acknowledged this fact, but he defended his translation by maintaining that the adverb "alone" was required by idiomatic German:

Luther further stated that sola was used in theological traditions before him and this adverb makes Paul's intended meaning clearer:

Other Catholic authorities also used "alone" in their translation of Romans 3:28 or exegesis of salvation by faith passages.

Faith and works
Paul was not antinomian. While salvation cannot be achieved through works (Titus ), faith being a unity with Christ in the Spirit naturally issues in love (Galatians ). This was Martin Luther's emphasis likewise.

In relation to Sola Fide, the place of works is found in the second chapter of the Epistle to the Ephesians: Justification is by grace through faith, "not from yourselves" and "not by works". In other words, it is by faith alone since all human efforts are excluded here (Ephesians ). Ephesians goes on to say that every person who has faith is to produce good works, according to God's plan (Ephesians ). These works, however, are not a cause of forgiveness but a result of forgiveness. Faith alone justifies but faith is never alone. It is followed by works. In short, works of love are the goal of the saving faith (1 Timothy ).

According to the Defense of the Augsburg Confession of Philipp Melanchthon, the Epistle of James clearly teaches that the recipients of the letter have been justified by God through the saving Gospel (James ):
 

In answer to a question on James  ("you see that a person is justified by what he does and not by faith alone"), the Wisconsin Evangelical Lutheran Synod has written: "In James 2, the author was dealing with errorists who said that if they had faith they didn't need to show their love by a life of faith (2:14–17). James countered this error by teaching that true, saving faith is alive, showing itself to be so by deeds of love (James 2:18, 26). The author of James taught that justification is by faith alone and also that faith is never alone but shows itself to be alive by good deeds that express a believer's thanks to God for the free gift of salvation by faith in Jesus Christ."

According to the Defense of the Augsburg Confession again,

In Article XX of Good Works, the Augsburg Confession states that:

Martin Luther, who opposed antinomianism, is recorded as stating, "Works are necessary for salvation but they do not cause salvation; for faith alone gives life."

In his Introduction to Romans, Luther stated that saving faith is,

a living, creative, active and powerful thing, this faith. Faith cannot help doing good works constantly. It doesn’t stop to ask if good works ought to be done, but before anyone asks, it already has done them and continues to do them without ceasing.  Anyone who does not do good works in this manner is an unbeliever...Thus, it is just as impossible to separate faith and works as it is to separate heat and light from fire!

Scottish theologian John Murray of Westminster Theological Seminary in Philadelphia, asserted:

"Faith alone justifies but a justified person with faith alone would be a monstrosity which never exists in the kingdom of grace. Faith works itself out through love (Gal. 5:6). And Faith without works is dead (James 2:17–20)."
"It is living faith that justifies and living faith unites to Christ both in the virtue of his death and in the power of his resurrection. No one has entrusted himself to Christ for deliverance from the guilt of sin who has not also entrusted himself to him for deliverance from the power of sin."

Contemporary evangelical theologian R. C. Sproul writes:

The relationship of faith and good works is one that may be distinguished but never separated ... if good works do not follow from our profession of faith, it is a clear indication that we do not possess justifying faith. The Reformed formula is, "We are justified by faith alone but not by a faith that is alone."

Michael Horton concurs by saying:

This debate, therefore, is not over the question of whether God renews us and initiates a process of gradual growth in holiness throughout the course of our lives. 'We are justified by faith alone, but not by a faith that is alone,' Luther stated, and this recurring affirmation of the new birth and sanctification as necessarily linked to justification leads one to wonder how the caricatures continue to be perpetuated without foundation.

Works of the Law 
Many Catholics see the exclusion of "works of the law" as only referring to works done for salvation under the Mosaic law, versus works of faith which are held as meritorious for salvation.

Adherents of sola fide respond that Jesus was not instituting keeping a higher moral code as means of salvation, and tend to see the exclusion of "works of the law" (as the means of obtaining justification) as referring to any works of the Mosaic law, and by implication, any "works of righteousness which we have done" (Titus ) or any system in which one earns eternal life on the basis of the merit of works.

However, most understand that the "righteousness of the law" is to be fulfilled by those who are justified by faith (Romans ). The Mosaic law and the principles of the gospel (such as the Sermon on the Mount and the Last Judgment of Matthew 25) are seen as being in correspondence, with the latter fulfilling, clarifying, and expanding on the former, centering on God's love for us, and love to others. Thus a Lutheran or Reformed believer can claim that "the law is holy, and the commandment holy, and just, and good," (Romans ) harmonizing the two principles of the same Bible.

Reconciliation of differing emphases

Christian theologies answer questions about the nature, function, and meaning of justification quite differently. These issues include: Is justification an event occurring instantaneously or is it an ongoing process? Is justification effected by divine action alone (monergism), by divine and human action together (synergism), or by human action (erroneously called Pelagianism)? Is justification permanent or can it be lost? What is the relationship of justification to sanctification, the process whereby sinners become righteous and are enabled by the Holy Spirit to live lives pleasing to God?

Further, many Protestant churches actually hold more nuanced positions such as sola gratia, sola fide or justification by faith (i.e. without the alone). According to a 2017 survey conducted in Western Europe by the Pew Research Center, "fewer people say that faith alone (in Latin, sola fide) leads to salvation, the position that Martin Luther made a central rallying cry of 16th-century Protestant reformers." Protestants in every country surveyed except Norway are more likely to say that both good deeds and faith in God are necessary for salvation.

The Joint Declaration on the Doctrine of Justification (JDDJ), signed by both the Lutheran World Federation and the Roman Catholic Church on 31 October 1999 declares:

We confess together that good works – a Christian life lived in faith, hope and love – follow justification and are its fruits. When the justified live in Christ and act in the grace they receive, they bring forth, in biblical terms, good fruit. Since Christians struggle against sin their entire lives, this consequence of justification is also for them an obligation they must fulfill. Thus both Jesus and the apostolic Scriptures admonish Christians to bring forth the works of love.

The Joint Declaration on the Doctrine of Justification (JDDJ), signed by the Lutheran World Federation and the Catholic Church, says that "sinners are justified by faith in the saving action of God in Christ. ... Such a faith is active in love and thus the Christian cannot and should not remain without works." And later, "Good works – a Christian life lived in faith, hope and love – follow justification and are its fruits. When the justified live in Christ and act in the grace they receive, they bring forth, in biblical terms, good fruit. Since Christians struggle against sin their entire lives, this consequence of justification is also for them an obligation they must fulfill. Thus both Jesus and the apostolic Scriptures admonish Christians to bring forth the works of love."

The Joint Declaration never mentions the expression Sola Fide and the Catechism of the Catholic Church clearly teaches that salvation is obtained by a combination of both faith and good works, which are considered to be a human response to God's grace.

Epistle of James and Pauline Epistles
Chapter 2 of the Epistle of James, verses 14–26, discusses faith and works, starting with verse 14, "What doth it profit, my brethren, though a man say he hath faith, and have not works? Can faith save him?" In verse 20 it says that faith without works is dead.

The Defense of the Augsburg Confession rejects the idea that the Epistle of James contradicts the Lutheran teaching on Justification.

Confessional Lutheran theologians summarize James 2: "we are justified/declared righteous by people when they see the good works we do as a result of our faith and they conclude that our faith is sincere."

In answer to another question on James 2:24 as well as Romans 3:23–24, the Wisconsin Evangelical Lutheran Synod replied:

A Lutheran exegesis further points out that James is simply reaffirming Jesus' teaching in Matthew 7:16, and that in the tenth verse of the same chapter ("For whoever keeps the whole law and yet stumbles at just one point is guilty of breaking all of it"), James too denies works as a means to obtain forgiveness:

Lutheran and Reformed Protestants, as well as others, base the sola fide on the fact that the New Testament contains almost two hundred statements that appear to imply that faith or belief is sufficient for salvation, for example: "Jesus said unto her, I am the resurrection, and the life: he that believeth in me, though he were dead, yet shall he live." and especially Paul's words in Romans, "Therefore we conclude that a man is justified by faith without the deeds of the law."
"Now to him that worketh is the reward not reckoned of grace, but of debt. But to him that worketh not, but believeth on him that justifieth the ungodly, his faith is counted for righteousness."

The precise relationship between faith and good works remains an area of controversy in some Protestant traditions (see also Law and Gospel). Even at the outset of the Reformation, subtle differences of emphasis appeared. For example, because the Epistle of James emphasizes the importance of good works, Martin Luther sometimes referred to it as the "epistle of straw". Calvin on the other hand, while not intending to differ with Luther, wrote of the necessity of good works as a consequence or 'fruit' of faith. The Anabaptists tended to make a nominal distinction between faith and obedience.

A recent article suggests that the current confusion regarding the Epistle of James about faith and works resulted from Augustine of Hippo's anti-Donatist polemic in the early fifth century. This approach reconciles the views of Paul and James on faith and works.  Recent meetings of scholars and clergy have attempted to soften the antithesis between Protestant and Catholic conceptions of the role of faith in salvation, which, if they were successful, would have far reaching implications for the relationship between most Protestant churches and the Catholic Church. These attempts to form a consensus are accepted among many Protestants and Catholics, but among others, sola fide continues to divide the Reformation churches, including many Lutherans, Reformed, and others, from other denominations. Some statements of the doctrine are interpreted as a denial of the doctrine as understood by other groups.

Catholic view 

In the Council of Trent (1545-1563), the Catholic Church cautioned against an extreme version of sola fide in canon XIV on self-righteousness and justification without repentance, declaring: "If any one says, that man is truly absolved from his sins and justified, because that he assuredly believed himself absolved and justified; or, that no one is truly justified but he who believes himself justified; and that, by this faith alone, absolution and justification are effected; let him be anathema." 

Pope Benedict XVI summarized the Catholic position as "...Luther's phrase: "faith alone" is true, if it is not opposed to faith in charity, in love. Faith is looking at Christ, entrusting oneself to Christ, being united to Christ, conformed to Christ, to his life. ... St Paul speaks of faith that works through love (cf. Gal 5: 14)."

The following principles from the Catechism of the Catholic Church (labeled by paragraph number) are useful for understanding the Catholic view of justification.

 1989.  Justification is not only the remission of sins, but also the sanctification and renewal of the interior man.
 1990.  Justification detaches man from sin which contradicts the love of God, and purifies his heart of sin.
 1991. With justification, faith, hope, and charity are poured into our hearts, and obedience to the divine will is granted us.
 1992. Justification has been merited for us by the Passion of Christ who offered himself on the cross as a living victim, holy and pleasing to God, and whose blood has become the instrument of atonement for the sins of all men.
 1993. Justification establishes cooperation between God's grace and man's freedom. On man's part it is expressed by the assent of faith to the Word of God, which invites him to conversion, and in the cooperation of charity with the prompting of the Holy Spirit who precedes and preserves his assent.
 1996. Our justification comes from the grace of God.
 2007. With regard to God, there is no strict right to any merit on the part of man.
 2010. Since the initiative belongs to God in the order of grace, no one can merit the initial grace of forgiveness and justification, at the beginning of conversion. Moved by the Holy Spirit and by charity, we can then merit for ourselves and for others the graces needed for our sanctification, for the increase of grace and charity, and for the attainment of eternal life.
 2011. The charity of Christ is the source in us of all our merits before God. Grace, by uniting us to Christ in active love, ensures the supernatural quality of our acts and consequently their merit before God and before men.

Thus the Catholic view could perhaps be interpreted as a progression or flow: first grace, then initial trust/repentance/conversion, then faith/hope/charity, combined with an emphasis that none of these elements should be isolated thus missing the package.

Further, the sacraments of baptism, Eucharist, and reconciliation relate to each: baptism for the removal of sin (in the case of an infant, original sin), Eucharist for the participation in Jesus' sacrifice, and penance for the confession of lapses of faith and charity and the assignment of prayers/actions to rejoin faith and charity. Sola fide is rejected only as far is it would ignore or reject grace or the New Commandment.

Some scholars of Early Christianity are adherents of the New Perspective on Paul and so believe sola fide is a misinterpretation on the part of Lutherans and that Paul was actually speaking about laws (such as Circumcision, Dietary laws, Sabbath, Temple rituals, etc.) that were considered essential for the Jews of the time.

Grace
The Catholic view holds instead that grace, specifically, the form of grace known as "sanctifying grace", and which first floods the soul at baptism, which empowers one's ability both to believe and to perform good works, is essential as the gateway to salvation, but not the only element needed for salvation (Eph 2:8–10). God's freely given grace is offered and empowers one's ability to believe and to perform good works, both then becoming meritorious because they are joined to Christ's saving power of the Cross. (Phil 2:12–13) (Catechism of the Catholic Church, 1987–2029) A Christian must respond to this free gift of Grace from God given first, ordinarily, in Baptism (1 Pet 3:21) both by having faith and by living in the light of Christ through love (Jn 3:16; 1 Jn 1:7) (Galatians 5:6) which perfects the Christian throughout his or her life (James 2:22). The Catholic position is best summed up in John 3:16, if one has the proper, contextual understanding of the word "believe". "Believe", in context and in ancient Judaism, meant more than an intellectual assent.  "To believe" also meant to obey, which is seen, in context, in Jn 3:36, 1 Jn 2:3ff, and 1 Jn 5:1ff. Without our positive response to grace offered, salvation is not possible.

As expounded in the Catechism of the Catholic Church, the Catholic Church's teaching is that it is the grace of God, "the free and undeserved help that God gives us to respond to his call", that justifies us, a grace that is a prerequisite for our free response of "collaboration in justification through faith, and in sanctification through charity".

Justification
According to the Catechism of the Catholic Church justification is conferred in baptism, the sacrament of faith. The sacrament of reconciliation enables recovery of justification, if lost through committing a mortal sin. A mortal sin makes justification lost, even if faith is still present.

The Council of Trent sought to clarify the Catholic Church's teaching on justification and the manner in which it differed from that proposed by Lutheran and Reformed Christians. It stated: "Faith is the beginning of human salvation, the foundation and root of all justification, without which it is impossible to please God and to come to the fellowship of His sons; and we are therefore said to be justified gratuitously, because none of those things that precede justification, whether faith or works, merit the grace of justification." "Faith, unless hope and charity be added to it, neither unites man perfectly with Christ nor makes him a living member of His body. For which reason it is most truly said that faith without works is dead and of no profit, and in Christ Jesus neither circumcision availeth anything nor uncircumcision, but faith that worketh by charity." After being justified, "to those who work well unto the end and trust in God, eternal life is to be offered, both as a grace mercifully promised to the sons of God through Christ Jesus, and as a reward promised by God himself, to be faithfully given to their good works and merits. ... Since Christ Jesus Himself, as the head into the members and the vine into the branches, continually infuses strength into those justified, which strength always precedes, accompanies and follows their good works, and without which they could not in any manner be pleasing and meritorious before God, we must believe that nothing further is wanting to those justified to prevent them from being considered to have, by those very works which have been done in God, fully satisfied the divine law according to the state of this life and to have truly merited eternal life, to be obtained in its [due] time, provided they depart [this life] in grace".

In its canons, the Council condemned the following propositions:
 man can be justified before God by his own works, whether done by his own natural powers or through the teaching of the law, without divine grace through Jesus Christ (canon 1);
 the sinner is justified by faith alone, meaning that nothing else is required to cooperate in order to obtain the grace of justification, and that it is not in any way necessary that he be prepared and disposed by the action of his own will (canon 9);
 the commandments of God are, even for one that is justified and constituted in grace, impossible to observe (canon 18);
 the justice received is not preserved and also not increased before God through good works, but those works are merely the fruits and signs of justification obtained, but not the cause of its increase (canon 24);
 the good works of the one justified are in such manner the gifts of God that they are not also the good merits of him justified; or the one justified by the good works that he performs by the grace of God and the merit of Jesus Christ, whose living member he is, does not truly merit an increase of grace, eternal life, and in case he dies in grace, the attainment of eternal life itself and also an increase of glory (canon 32).

Biblical exegesis
Catholic exegetes believe that St. James, to continue the thread above, had no other object than to emphasize the fact—already emphasized by St. Paul—that only such faith as is active in charity and good works (fides caritate formata) possesses any power to justify man (cf. Galatians 5:6; 1 Corinthians 13:2), whilst faith devoid of charity and good works (fides informis) is a dead faith and in the eyes of God insufficient for justification (cf. James 2:17 sqq.)

In response to sola fide, Robert Sungenis argues in his 1997 book Not by Faith Alone that:
 Lutherans and Reformed Christians have devised many and varied explanations to neutralize the clear and unambiguous statement in Jm 2:24 that "man is justified by works and not by faith alone." Each of these explanations concludes that James is not teaching that man is justified by works in the same sense that Paul says man is justified by faith. Puzzled by James's language, Martin Luther even concluded that the epistle of James was a spurious book and should not be canonically authoritative for New Testament teaching.
 Countering the Lutheran and Reformed Christian explanation of the epistle of James which states that James means that "men" witness Abraham's works, the Genesis text (Genesis 22) does not include any men as witness to Abraham's works, but only God himself.
 Countering the Lutheran and Reformed Christian explanation of James which holds that the word "justified" as James uses the term refers to a "vindication," rather than to a salvific justification, as Paul uses the term, are the following arguments:
 If James were teaching a concept of "vindication," he would have said, with the proper Greek word, "you see, a person is vindicated by works." Moreover, since James adds the clause "and not by faith alone" we know that he is correcting a false notion concerning the solitude of faith in justification, not suggesting that Abraham was vindicated by works.
 If James were attempting to teach a vindication of Abraham, the specific argumentation he used would make sense only if James's opponents had claimed that Abraham was "vindicated by faith alone." In other words, if the vindication hypothesis were true, syntactical requirements would have forced James to use the meaning of "vindicated" in the first part of his argument (Jm 2:20–21) in order also to use it in the latter part (Jm 2:24). Since the grammatical structure of the verse would then require that the phrase "not by faith alone" have its referent in the phrase "is vindicated," this would force the meaning of the verse to be, "a person is vindicated ... not by faith alone"—a meaning that has no relevance to James's discussion.
 The New Testament does not use the word "justified" in the sense of "vindicated" in contexts which are soteriological, i.e., contexts which discuss salvation or damnation. Moreover, such passages as Mt 11:19 where one could plausibly interpret the Greek word dikaioo as referring to a vindication do so only in a metaphorical sense; therefore they do not use dikaioo in the same way that James, and even Paul, use the term, which is historical and literal.
 James's discussion of the events surrounding the justification of Rahab preclude assigning the meaning of "vindicated" to the word justified. Rahab's justification, as described in Jm 2:25, is a salvific justification, not a vindication, yet James specifies that Rahab was justified "in the same way" that Abraham was justified. Therefore, one cannot understand Abraham's justification as a vindication.
 Since James and Paul use the same Greek noun dikaiosune ("righteous") in reference to Abraham, and interpret the word in the same way (cf. Gn 15:6, Rm 4:3, Jm 2:23), it would be totally incongruous for one of them to use a different meaning of its verbal cognate dikaioo in reference to Abraham.
 The Lutherans and Reformed Christian position assumes that Abraham's justification is a once-for-all event. James's all important question "Can faith save him?" (Jm 2:14), however, includes Abraham within its purview. Hence we must conclude that if Abraham's works were not of the quality that James prescribes in the context (Jm 2:15), then Abraham would not be justified. Abraham could not be justified in a "once-for-all" event in Gn 15:6 and at the same time have that justification put in jeopardy by disobedience to James's requirement of works for justification. If this could happen, the question in Jm 2:14 would have no meaning.
 Abraham's acts in Genesis 12, 15, and 22 were acts of faith and works. We should not misconstrue Paul's stress on Abraham's faith in his view of Gn 15:6 to say that Abraham performed no works of loving obedience to God at this time or prior, nor should we misconstrue James's view of works in Genesis 22 to say that Abraham's attempted sacrifice of Isaac was not a supreme act of faith. Similarly, Abraham's departure from his homeland in Genesis 12 also couples his faith and works in regard to justification. Throughout his life, in the periods recorded in Genesis 13–14, 16–21, and 23–25 which are between the times of his recorded faith and obedience in the New Testament, Abraham continued to live in faith and obedience, with only what we may call minor lapses along the way. Genesis 22's importance is its detailing of Abraham's quintessential act of the faith-and-works which allowed God to swear an oath of blessing to him and for all his future descendants. Abraham's act in Genesis 22, not Gn 15:6, was the most important act in Abraham's life. The act in Genesis 22 was just as much a crediting of righteousness to Abraham as that in Gn 15:6.
 The entire context of the book of James concerns what one must do to be saved. He concentrates on obedience to the law as the means of salvation, and judgment for those who disobey that law.
 James includes sins of commission as well as omission in his warning against disobedience to the law. The supreme law, or "royal law," that James has in view is the law of love.
 James assumes that the audience to whom he writes already has faith in God. The main question that James poses to them is whether they have added works to their faith. James does not suggest that works will immediately or inevitably flow from one who has faith, even though he may have a greater disposition towards good works once he has faith. James teaches that one who has faith must make a daily, conscious decision to do good works, just as he must decide each day to refrain from sin. In fact, if he chooses not to do good works when the opportunity arises, he has sinned (Jm 4:17).
 James does not support the Lutherans and Reformed Christian concept that one can be saved as long as he has "saving faith." James is not so much attempting to qualify the faith needed for justification as he is saying that one must consciously add works to faith in order to be justified. A person, to be justified, must persevere to his last breath in this conscious decision to add works to faith.
 One of the most heinous in the catalogue of sins that James specifies is sin of the tongue. What is "said" to God and man is of the utmost importance to James and a major criterion on how the individual will be judged.
 Both Paul and James speak of the works of love that one must add to his faith in order to be justified.
 Like Paul, James concludes that if one chooses the system of law and desires God to evaluate him on that basis without the benefit of grace, he must then obey the whole law without fault. For one fault, the law will utterly condemn him.

Anabaptist view 

Anabaptist cleric David Griffin writes:

Methodist view 

Methodism affirms the doctrine of justification by faith, but in Wesleyan–Arminian theology, justification refers to "pardon, the forgiveness of sins", rather than "being made actually just and righteous", which Methodists believe is accomplished through sanctification. John Wesley, the founder of the Methodist Churches, taught that the keeping of the moral law contained in the Ten Commandments, as well as engaging in the works of piety and the works of mercy, were "indispensable for our sanctification".

Methodist pastor Amy Wagner has written:

Methodist soteriology emphasizes the importance of the pursuit of holiness in salvation. Thus, for Wesley, "true faith ... cannot subsist without works". Bishop Scott J. Jones in United Methodist Doctrine (2002) writes that in Methodist theology:

Bishop Jones concludes that "United Methodist doctrine thus understands true, saving faith to be the kind that, given time and opportunity, will result in good works. Any supposed faith that does not in fact lead to such behaviors is not genuine, saving faith." Methodist evangelist Phoebe Palmer stated that "justification would have ended with me had I refused to be holy". While "faith is essential for a meaningful relationship with God, our relationship with God also takes shape through our care for people, the community, and creation itself." Methodism, influenced by Lutheran Pietism and influential in the Holiness movement, thus teaches that "justification [is made] conditional on obedience and progress in sanctification", emphasizing "a deep reliance upon Christ not only in coming to faith, but in remaining in the faith".

Richard P. Bucher contrasts this position with the Lutheran one, discussing an analogy put forth by the founder of the Methodist Church, John Wesley:

Supporting  confessional excerpts

Anabaptism
The position of the Mennonite Church USA is set out in the pamphlet Confession of Faith in a Mennonite Perspective (1995). It is a typical Anabaptist confession of faith. The commentary to Article 8 of the Confession states:

Anglicanism
The Anglican position is set out in the Thirty-nine Articles, specifically Article XI "Of the Justification of Man":

Lutheranism

Southern Baptist

Reformed Baptist

Chapter XI of the London Baptist Confession of Faith 1689 is the same as the Westminster Confession of Faith.

Reformed (Continental)

Reformed (Presbyterian)

Methodism

The following statements from confessions of faiths of the Wesleyan–Arminian tradition reflect Methodist theology on salvation:

Non-denominational Evangelicals

Additional ecumenical statements

Evangelicals

Lutheran World Federation and the Roman Catholic Church

In the preamble , it is suggested that much of the debate on sola fide has been based on condemnations of caricatured positions not actually held: "The teaching of the Lutheran Churches presented in the Declaration does not fall under the condemnations from the Council of Trent. The condemnations in the Lutheran Confessions do not apply to the teaching of the Roman Catholic Church presented in this Declaration."

Lutheran-Orthodox Joint Commission

See also

 Antinomianism
 Belief in Jesus
 Double imputation
 Expounding of the Law
 Fate of the unlearned
 Justification from eternity

Citations

External links

 "By Faith Alone" and James (a Confessional Lutheran perspective)
 Importance of Sola Fide (a Confessional Lutheran perspective)
 Good Works (a Confessional Lutheran perspective)
 Essays on Sola Fide, Page 1& Page 2, Wisconsin Lutheran Seminary
 Bible Verses on Sola Fide (a Catholic perspective)
 
 Is There a Contradiction Between Faith and Works? (Article stating that faith without works is impossible)

Five solae
Lutheran theology
Salvation in Protestantism
Latin religious words and phrases
Protestantism-related controversies
Christian terminology
Faith in Christianity